Pycnarmon virgatalis is a moth in the family Crambidae. It was described by Frederic Moore in 1867. This moth can be found in India and Sri Lanka.

References

Spilomelinae
Moths described in 1867
Moths of Asia
Moths of Sri Lanka